Cut is the sixteenth studio album by Dutch hard rock band Golden Earring, released in 1982 (see 1982 in music). The album spawned the hit song "Twilight Zone," which reached No. 1 in the Netherlands and No. 1 in the United States on Billboards Hot Mainstream Rock Tracks (it reached No. 10 on the Billboard Hot 100.)

The album's cover image is the 1964 photo Cutting the Card Quickly taken by M.I.T. Professor "Doc" Edgerton showing the jack of diamonds playing card being shredded by a bullet. The image is used in the music video of "Twilight Zone" in which the card represents the life of the rogue espionage agent.

A music video was also made to support the second single released from the album, "The Devil Made Me Do It." However, the video saw limited airplay in the United States, because its lyrics contain the word "bullshit."

Track listing
All songs written by Hay and Kooymans except where noted.

 "The Devil Made Me Do It" – 3:25
 "Future" (Kooymans) – 5:25
 "Baby Dynamite" (Hay) – 5:15
 "Last of the Mohicans" – 4:09
 "Lost and Found" (Gerritsen, Hay) – 4:00
 "Twilight Zone" (Kooymans) – 7:58
 "Chargin' Up My Batteries" – 4:17
 "Secrets" (Hay) – 4:04

Personnel

Golden Earring
 Rinus Gerritsen - bass, keyboards
 Barry Hay - guitar, vocals
 George Kooymans - guitar, vocals
 Cesar Zuiderwijk - drums

Additional personnel 
 Robert Jan Stips - synthesizer

Production
 Producer: Shell Schellekens
 Engineer: John Kriek
 Digital mastering: Dick Van Leeuwen
 Horn arrangements: Hans Hollestelle
 Photography: Harold Edgerton, Kees Tabak
 Lettering: Koos O.

Charts

Album

Singles

Twilight Zone

The Devil Made Me Do It

Certifications

References

Golden Earring albums
1982 albums
Capitol Records albums
Mercury Records albums
PolyGram albums